Stampede Dam (National ID # CA10192) is a dam in Sierra County, California, impounding the Little Truckee River.

The earthen and rock-filled dam was constructed in 1970, at 239 feet high and 1,511 feet long at the crest.  It was a project of the United States Bureau of Reclamation, not primarily for flood control or irrigation storage as usual, but for fishery enhancement, primarily to facilitate the spawning of the critically endangered species cui-ui fish downstream.  The dam is owned and operated by the Bureau.

The reservoir it creates, Stampede Reservoir, has a water surface of about 3,340 acres and about 25 miles of shoreline, with a maximum capacity of 226,500 acre-feet.  Recreation includes fishing (for kokanee salmon, rainbow, brook, brown and lake (mackinaw) trout, etc.), hunting, boating, camping and hiking. There is an accessible viewing platform at Stampede Vista Point.

See also 
 List of lakes in California
 List of dams and reservoirs in California

References 

Dams in California
Reservoirs in California
United States Bureau of Reclamation dams
Buildings and structures in Sierra County, California
Embankment dams
Dams completed in 1970
Reservoirs in Sierra County, California
Reservoirs in Northern California
1970 establishments in California